Desenci is a small settlement in the Municipality of Destrnik in northeastern Slovenia. It lies in the Pesnica Valley. The area is part of the traditional region of Styria. The municipality is now included in the Drava Statistical Region.

References

External links
Desenci on Geopedia

Populated places in the Municipality of Destrnik